Class of '07 is an Australian comedy television series created by Kacie Anning, and starring Emily Browning, Megan Smart, and Caitlin Stasey. It premiered on Prime Video on March 17, 2023.

Synopsis
An apocalyptic tidal wave hits during the 10-year reunion of an all-girls high school. The group has to find a way to survive on the island peak of their old high school campus, while dealing with old high school drama.

Cast
 Emily Browning as Zoe
 Megan Smart as Amelia
 Caitlin Stasey as Saskia
 Claire Lovering as Genevieve
 Emma Horn as Renee
 Steph Tisdell as Phoebe
 Sana'a Shaik as Teresa
 Rose Flanagan as Laura
 Chi Nguyen as Megan
 Bernie Van Tiel as Tegan
 Sarah Krndija as Sandy
 Debra Lawrance as Sister Becky

Episodes

Production
Class of '07 was first announced on May 18, 2021. On December 13, 2021, it was reported that production had begun in Australia, through Matchbox Pictures, starring Emily Browning, Caitlin Stasey, and Megan Smart. The all-female ensemble comedy series is created, written, and directed by Kacie Anning. It was filmed in and around Sydney.

Release
The eight-part, 30-minute series premiered on Prime Video on March 17, 2023.

Reception
Anna Govert of Paste called the series "a brutal and raw examination of womanhood and the aftereffects of high school, a love letter to female friendships, and a raunchy and rowdy good time to boot." Katie Cunningham of The Guardian gave it 3 out of 5 stars, calling the cast "utterly charming" and concluding that the series "finds its rhythm as it gets further along."

References

External links 
 

English-language television shows
2023 Australian television series debuts
2020s Australian comedy television series
Television series by Matchbox Pictures
Amazon Prime Video original programming